Sphecodina caudata is a moth of the family Sphingidae. It is found in the southern Russian Far East, the Korean Peninsula, eastern and southern China and northern Thailand.

The wingspan is 62–67 mm.

References

Macroglossini
Moths described in 1853